"Paramesorhizobium deserti" is an antibiotic resistant bacterium from the genus "Paramesorhizobium" which has been isolated from soil from the Taklimakan Desert in China.

References

Phyllobacteriaceae
Bacteria described in 2015